In Modern English, cult is a term for relatively small group that excessively controls its members, whom share set of acts and practices which require unwavering devotion, and are considered deviant (outside the norms of society), and typically led by a charismatic and often self-appointed leader. Considered pejorative by some, this term is less often used for a social group that is defined by its unusual religious, spiritual, or philosophical beliefs and rituals, or its common interest in a particular personality, object, or goal. This sense of the term is weakly definedhaving divergent definitions both in popular culture and academiaand has also been an ongoing source of contention among scholars across several fields of study.

An older sense of the word involves a set of religious devotional practices that is conventional within its culture, is related to a particular figure, and is frequently associated with a particular place. References to the imperial cult of ancient Rome, for example, use the word in this sense.

While the word is still being used in its literal and original sense, a derived sense of "excessive devotion" arose in the 19th century. Then, beginning in the 1930s, cults became an object of sociological study within the context of the study of religious behavior. Since the 1940s, the Christian countercult movement has opposed some sects and new religious movements, labeling them "cults" because of their unorthodox beliefs. Since the 1970s, the secular anti-cult movement has opposed certain groups and, as a reaction to acts of violence, frequently charged those cults with practicing mind control. Scholars and the media have disputed some of the claims and actions of anti-cult movements, leading to further public controversy.

Sociological classifications of religious movements may identify a cult as a social group with socially deviant or novel beliefs and practices, although this is often unclear. Other researchers present a less-organized picture of cults, saying that they arise spontaneously around novel beliefs and practices. Groups labelled as "cults" range in size from local groups with a few followers to international organizations with millions of adherents.

Definition
In the English-speaking world, the term cult often carries derogatory connotations. In this sense, it has been considered a subjective term, used as an ad hominem attack against groups with differing doctrines or practices. As such, religion scholar Megan Goodwin has defined the term cult, when it is used by the layperson, as often being shorthand for a "religion I don't like".

In the 1970s, with the rise of secular anti-cult movements, scholars (though not the general public) began to abandon the use of the term cult. According to The Oxford Handbook of Religious Movements, "by the end of the decade, the term 'new religions' would virtually replace the term 'cult' to describe all of those leftover groups that did not fit easily under the label of church or sect."

Sociologist Amy Ryan (2000) has argued for the need to differentiate those groups that may be dangerous from groups that are more benign. Ryan notes the sharp differences between definitions offered by cult opponents, who tend to focus on negative characteristics, and those offered by sociologists, who aim to create definitions that are value-free. The movements themselves may have different definitions of religion as well. George Chryssides also cites a need to develop better definitions to allow for common ground in the debate. Casino (1999) presents the issue as crucial to international human rights laws. Limiting the definition of religion may interfere with freedom of religion, while too broad a definition may give some dangerous or abusive groups "a limitless excuse for avoiding all unwanted legal obligations."

New religious movements

A new religious movement (NRM) is a religious community or spiritual group of modern origins (since the mid-1800s), which has a peripheral place within its society's dominant religious culture. NRMs can be novel in origin or part of a wider religion, in which case they are distinct from pre-existing denominations. In 1999, Eileen Barker estimated that NRMs, of which some but not all have been labelled as cults, number in the tens of thousands worldwide, most of which originated in Asia or Africa; and that the great majority of which have only a few members, some have thousands and only very few have more than a million. In 2007, religious scholar Elijah Siegler commented that, although no NRM had become the dominant faith in any country, many of the concepts which they had first introduced (often referred to as "New Age" ideas) have become part of worldwide mainstream culture.

Scholarly studies

Sociologist Max Weber (1864–1920) found that cults based on charismatic leadership often follow the routinization of charisma.
The concept of a cult as a sociological classification, however, was introduced in 1932 by American sociologist Howard P. Becker as an expansion of German theologian Ernst Troeltsch's church–sect typology. Troeltsch's aim was to distinguish between three main types of religious behaviour: churchly, sectarian, and mystical.

Becker further bisected Troeltsch's first two categories: church was split into ecclesia and denomination; and sect into sect and cult. Like Troeltsch's "mystical religion", Becker's cult refers to small religious groups that lack in organization and emphasize the private nature of personal beliefs. Later sociological formulations built on such characteristics, placing an additional emphasis on cults as deviant religious groups, "deriving their inspiration from outside of the predominant religious culture." This is often thought to lead to a high degree of tension between the group and the more mainstream culture surrounding it, a characteristic shared with religious sects. According to this sociological terminology, sects are products of religious schism and therefore maintain a continuity with traditional beliefs and practices, whereas cults arise spontaneously around novel beliefs and practices.

In the early 1960s, sociologist John Lofland, living with South Korean missionary Young Oon Kim and some of the first American Unification Church members in California, studied their activities in trying to promote their beliefs and win new members. Lofland noted that most of their efforts were ineffective and that most of the people who joined did so because of personal relationships with other members, often family relationships. Lofland published his findings in 1964 as a doctoral thesis entitled "The World Savers: A Field Study of Cult Processes", and in 1966 in book form by Prentice-Hall as Doomsday Cult: A Study of Conversion, Proselytization and Maintenance of Faith. It is considered to be one of the most important and widely cited studies of the process of religious conversion.

Sociologist Roy Wallis (1945–1990) argued that a cult is characterized by "epistemological individualism," meaning that "the cult has no clear locus of final authority beyond the individual member." Cults, according to Wallis, are generally described as "oriented towards the problems of individuals, loosely structured, tolerant [and] non-exclusive," making "few demands on members," without possessing a "clear distinction between members and non-members," having "a rapid turnover of membership" and as being transient collectives with vague boundaries and fluctuating belief systems. Wallis asserts that cults emerge from the "cultic milieu".

J. Gordon Melton stated that, in 1970, "one could count the number of active researchers on new religions on one's hands." However, James R. Lewis writes that the "meteoric growth" in this field of study can be attributed to the cult controversy of the early 1970s. Because of "a wave of nontraditional religiosity" in the late 1960s and early 1970s, academics perceived new religious movements as different phenomena from previous religious innovations.

In 1978, Bruce Campbell noted that cults are associated with beliefs in a divine element in the individual; it is either soul, self, or true self. Cults are inherently ephemeral and loosely organized. There is a major theme in many of the recent works that show the relationship between cults and mysticism. Campbell, describing cults as non-traditional religious groups based on belief in a divine element in the individual, brings two major types of such to attentionmystical and instrumentaldividing cults into either occult or metaphysical assembly. There is also a third type, the service-oriented, as Campbell states that "the kinds of stable forms which evolve in the development of religious organization will bear a significant relationship to the content of the religious experience of the founder or founders."

Dick Anthony, a forensic psychologist known for his criticism of brainwashing theory of conversion, has defended some so-called cults, and in 1988 argued that involvement in such movements may often have beneficial, rather than harmful effects, saying that "[t]here's a large research literature published in mainstream journals on the mental health effects of new religions. For the most part, the effects seem to be positive in any way that's measurable."

In their 1996 book Theory of Religion, American sociologists Rodney Stark and William Sims Bainbridge propose that the formation of cults can be explained through the rational choice theory. In The Future of Religion they comment that, "in the beginning, all religions are obscure, tiny, deviant cult movements." According to Marc Galanter, Professor of Psychiatry at NYU, typical reasons why people join cults include a search for community and a spiritual quest. Stark and Bainbridge, in discussing the process by which individuals join new religious groups, have even questioned the utility of the concept of conversion, suggesting that affiliation is a more useful concept.

Subcategories

Destructive cults

Destructive cult generally refers to groups whose members have, through deliberate action, physically injured or killed other members of their own group or other people. The Ontario Consultants on Religious Tolerance specifically limits the use of the term to religious groups that "have caused or are liable to cause loss of life among their membership or the general public." Psychologist Michael Langone, executive director of the anti-cult group International Cultic Studies Association, defines a destructive cult as "a highly manipulative group which exploits and sometimes physically and/or psychologically damages members and recruits."

John Gordon Clark argued that totalitarian systems of governance and an emphasis on money making are characteristics of a destructive cult. In Cults and the Family, the authors cite Shapiro, who defines a destructive cultism as a sociopathic syndrome, whose distinctive qualities include: "behavioral and personality changes, loss of personal identity, cessation of scholastic activities, estrangement from family, disinterest in society and pronounced mental control and enslavement by cult leaders."

In the opinion of Sociology Professor Benjamin Zablocki of Rutgers University, destructive cults are at high risk of becoming abusive to members, stating that such is in part due to members' adulation of charismatic leaders contributing to the leaders becoming corrupted by power. According to Barrett, the most common accusation made against destructive cults is sexual abuse. According to Kranenborg, some groups are risky when they advise their members not to use regular medical care. This may extend to physical and psychological harm.

Writing about Bruderhof communities in the book Misunderstanding Cults: Searching for Objectivity in a Controversial Field, Julius H. Rubin said that American religious innovation created an unending diversity of sects. These "new religious movements…gathered new converts and issued challenges to the wider society. Not infrequently, public controversy, contested narratives and litigation result." In his work Cults in Context author Lorne L. Dawson writes that although the Unification Church "has not been shown to be violent or volatile," it has been described as a destructive cult by "anticult crusaders." In 2002, the German government was held by the Federal Constitutional Court to have defamed the Osho movement by referring to it, among other things, as a "destructive cult" with no factual basis.

Some researchers have criticized the usage of the term destructive cult, writing that it is used to describe groups which are not necessarily harmful in nature to themselves or others. In his book Understanding New Religious Movements, John A. Saliba writes that the term is overgeneralized. Saliba sees the Peoples Temple as the "paradigm of a destructive cult", where those that use the term are implying that other groups will also commit mass suicide.

Doomsday cults

Doomsday cult is an expression which is used to describe groups that believe in Apocalypticism and Millenarianism, and it can also be used to refer both to groups that predict disaster, and groups that attempt to bring it about. In the 1950s, American social psychologist Leon Festinger and his colleagues observed members of a small UFO religion called the Seekers for several months, and recorded their conversations both prior to and after a failed prophecy from their charismatic leader. Their work was later published in the book When Prophecy Fails: A Social and Psychological Study of a Modern Group that Predicted the Destruction of the World. In the late 1980s, doomsday cults were a major topic of news reports, with some reporters and commentators considering them a serious threat to society. A 1997 psychological study by Festinger, Riecken, and Schachter found that people turned to a cataclysmic world view after they had repeatedly failed to find meaning in mainstream movements. People also strive to find meaning in global events such as the turn of the millennium when many predicted it prophetically marked the end of an age and thus the end of the world. An ancient Mayan calendar ended at the year 2012 and many anticipated catastrophic disasters would rock the Earth.

Political cults

A political cult is a cult with a primary interest in political action and ideology.  Groups that some have described as "political cults", mostly advocating far-left or far-right agendas, have received some attention from journalists and scholars. In their 2000 book On the Edge: Political Cults Right and Left, Dennis Tourish and Tim Wohlforth discuss about a dozen organizations in the United States and Great Britain that they characterize as cults. In a separate article, Tourish says that in his usage: 

In 1990, Lucy Patrick commented:

In Iran, a "cult of Khomeini" developed into a "secular religion". According to Iranian author Amir Taheri, Khomeini is called imam, making a "Twelver Shiism into a cult of Thirteen." Khomeini's image is engraved in giant rocks and mountain slopes, prayers begin and end with his name, and his fatwas remain valid beyond his death (something that goes against Shiite principles). Also slogans such as "God, Koran, Khomeini" or "God is One, Khomeini is the Leader" are used as war cries of the Hezballah in Iran. Even though Khomeini's photographs still hang in many government offices, it is said that by the late 1990s "Khomeini's cult had faded".

Ayn Rand Institute

Followers of Ayn Rand have been characterized as a cult by economist Murray N. Rothbard during her lifetime, and later by Michael Shermer. The core group around Rand was called the "Collective", which are now defunct; the chief group which is disseminating Rand's ideas today is the Ayn Rand Institute. Although the Collective advocated an individualist philosophy, Rothbard claimed that it was organized in the manner of a "Leninist" organization.

LaRouche movement

The LaRouche movement is a political and cultural network promoting the late Lyndon LaRouche and his ideas. It has included many organizations and companies around the world, which campaign, gather information and publish books and periodicals. It has been called "cult-like" by The New York Times.

The movement originated within the radical leftist student politics of the 1960s. In the 1970s and 1980s hundreds of candidates ran in state Democratic primaries in the United States on the 'LaRouche platform', while Lyndon LaRouche repeatedly campaigned for presidential nomination. However, the LaRouche movement is often considered far-right. During its peak in the 1970s and 1980s, the LaRouche movement developed a private intelligence agency and contacts with foreign governments.

New Acropolis

An Argentinian esoteric group founded in 1957 by former theosophist Jorge Angel Livraga, the New Acropolis Cultural Association has been described by scholars as an ultra-conservative, neo-fascist and white supremacist paramilitary group. The group itself denies such descriptions.

Unification Church

Founded by North Korea-born Sun Myung Moon, the Unification Church (also known as the Unification movement) holds a strong anti-Communist position.  In the 1940s, Moon cooperated with members of the Communist Party of Korea in the Korean independence movement against Imperial Japan. However, after the Korean War (1950–1953), he became an outspoken anti-communist.  Moon viewed the Cold War  between democracy and communism as the final conflict between God and Satan, with divided Korea as its primary front line.  Soon after its founding the Unification movement began supporting anti-communist organizations, including the World League for Freedom and Democracy founded in 1966 in Taipei, Republic of China (Taiwan), by Chiang Kai-shek,  and the Korean Culture and Freedom Foundation, an international public diplomacy organization  which also  sponsored Radio Free Asia.

In 1974 the Unification Church supported Republican President Richard Nixon and rallied in his favor after the Watergate scandal, with Nixon thanking personally for it.  In 1975 Moon spoke at a government sponsored rally against potential North Korean military aggression on Yeouido Island in Seoul to an audience of around 1 million.  The Unification movement was criticized by both the mainstream media and the alternative press for its anti-communist activism, which many said could lead to World War Three and a nuclear holocaust.

In 1977, the Subcommittee on International Organizations of the Committee on International Relations, of the United States House of Representatives, found that the South Korean intelligence agency, the KCIA, had used the movement to gain political influence with the United States and that some members had worked as volunteers in Congressional offices. Together they founded the Korean Cultural Freedom Foundation, a nonprofit organization which acted as a public diplomacy campaign for the Republic of Korea. The committee also investigated possible KCIA influence on the Unification Church's campaign in support of Nixon.

In 1980, members founded CAUSA International, an anti-communist educational organization based in New York City. In the 1980s, it was active in 21 countries. In the United States, it sponsored educational conferences for evangelical and fundamentalist Christian leaders as well as seminars and conferences for Senate staffers, Hispanic Americans and conservative activists. In 1986, CAUSA International sponsored the documentary film Nicaragua Was Our Home, about the Miskito Indians of Nicaragua and their persecution at the hands of the Nicaraguan government. It was filmed and produced by USA-UWC member Lee Shapiro, who later died while filming with anti-Soviet forces during the Soviet–Afghan War.

In 1983, some American members joined a public protest against the Soviet Union over its shooting down of Korean Airlines Flight 007. In 1984, the HSA–UWC founded the Washington Institute for Values in Public Policy, a Washington D.C. think tank that underwrites conservative-oriented research and seminars at Stanford University, the University of Chicago, and other institutions. In the same year, member Dan Fefferman founded the International Coalition for Religious Freedom in Virginia, which is active in protesting what it considers to be threats to religious freedom by governmental agencies. In August 1985 the Professors World Peace Academy, an organization founded by Moon, sponsored a conference in Geneva to debate the theme "The situation in the world after the fall of the communist empire."

In April 1990, Moon visited the Soviet Union and met with President Mikhail Gorbachev. Moon expressed support for the political and economic transformations underway in the Soviet Union. At the same time, the movement was expanding into formerly communist nations.  In 1994, The New York Times recognized the movement's political influence, saying it was "a theocratic powerhouse that is pouring foreign fortunes into conservative causes in the United States." In 1998, the Egyptian newspaper Al-Ahram criticized Moon's "ultra-right leanings" and suggested a personal relationship with conservative Israeli prime minister Benjamin Netanyahu.

During the presidency of George W. Bush, Dong Moon Joo, a Unification movement member and then president of The Washington Times, undertook unofficial diplomatic missions to North Korea in an effort to improve its relationship with the United States. Joo was born in North Korea and is a citizen of the United States.

The Unification Church also owns several news outlets including The Washington Times, Insight on the News, United Press International and the News World Communications network. Washington Times opinion editor Charles Hurt was one of Donald Trump's earliest supporters in Washington, D.C. In 2018, he included Trump with Ronald Reagan, Martin Luther King Jr., Margaret Thatcher, and Pope John Paul II as "great champions of freedom." In 2016 The Washington Times did not endorse a  candidate for United States president, but endorsed Trump for reelection in 2020.

Workers Revolutionary Party

In Britain, the Workers Revolutionary Party (WRP), a Trotskyist group which was led by Gerry Healy and strongly supported by actress Vanessa Redgrave, has been described by others, who have been involved in the Trotskyist movement, as having been a cult or a group which displayed cult-like characteristics during the 1970s and 1980s. It is also described as such by Wohlforth and Tourish, to whom Bob Pitt, a former member of the WRP, concedes that it had a "cult-like character" though arguing that rather than being typical of the far left, this feature actually made the WRP atypical and "led to its being treated as a pariah within the revolutionary left itself."

Other groups
Organizations like the Mexican far-right group El Yunque, which sponsored the Spanish far right party Vox, the QAnon conspiracy theory, and the growing neo-Pentecostal political influence in Latin America, can be characterised as cults.

Gino Perente's National Labor Federation (NATLFED) and Marlene Dixon's now-defunct Democratic Workers Party are an examples of political groups that have been described as "cults". A critical history of the DWP is given in Bounded Choice by Janja Lalich, a sociologist and former DWP member. Lutte Ouvrière (LO; "Workers' Struggle") in France, publicly headed by Arlette Laguiller but revealed in the 1990s to be directed by Robert Barcia, has often been criticized as a cult, for example, by Daniel Cohn-Bendit and his older brother Gabriel Cohn-Bendit, as well as by L'Humanité and Libération.

In his book Les Sectes Politiques: 1965–1995 (Political cults: 1965–1995), French writer Cyril Le Tallec considers some religious groups that were involved in politics at that time. He included the Cultural Office of Cluny, New Acropolis, the Divine Light Mission, Tradition Family Property (TFP), Longo Maï, the Supermen Club, and the Association for Promotion of the Industrial Arts (Solazaref).

Several former leaders of the Groyper movementan alt-right faction that infuses white supremacy, Christian nationalism, and Incel ideologyhave accused Nick Fuentes of leading it like a cult, describing him as abusing and demanding absolute loyalty from his followers. Fuentes praised having a "cult-like... mentality" and admitted to "ironically" describing his own movement as a cult.

Polygamist cults

Cults that teach and practice polygamy, marriage between more than two people, most often polygyny, one man having multiple wives, have long been noted, although they are a minority.  It has been estimated that there are around 50,000 members of polygamist cults in North America. Often, polygamist cults are viewed negatively by both legal authorities and mainstream society, and this view sometimes includes negative perceptions of related mainstream denominations, because of their perceived links to possible domestic violence and child abuse.

From the 1830s, members of the Church of Jesus Christ of Latter-day Saints (LDS Church) practiced polygamy, or plural marriage. In 1890, the president of the LDS Church, Wilford Woodruff, issued a public manifesto which announced that the LDS Church had ceased performing new plural marriages. Anti-Mormon sentiment waned, as did opposition to statehood for Utah. The Smoot Hearings in 1904, which documented that members of the LDS Church were still practising polygamy, spurred the church to issue a Second Manifesto, again claiming that it had ceased performing new plural marriages. By 1910, the LDS Church excommunicated those who entered into or performed new plural marriages. Enforcement of the 1890 Manifesto caused various splinter groups to leave the LDS Church in order to continue the practice of plural marriage. Such groups are known as Mormon fundamentalists. For example, the Fundamentalist Church of Jesus Christ of Latter-Day Saints is often described as a polygamist cult.

Racist cults

Sociologist and historian Orlando Patterson has described the Ku Klux Klan, which arose in the American South after the Civil War, as a heretical Christian cult, and he has also described its persecution of African Americans and others as a form of human sacrifice. During the nineteenth and early twentieth centuries, the existence of secret Aryan cults in Germany and Austria strongly influenced the Völkisch movement and the rise of Nazism. Modern-day white power skinhead groups in the United States tend to use the same recruitment techniques as groups which are characterized as destructive cults.

Vibert L. White, Jr., a former member of the Nation of Islam and a former leading advisor to it, characterized the organization as a cult, accusing its leader Louis Farrakhan, along with other organizational leaders, of using black nationalism and religious dogma to exploit black people for personal and political gain. The Nation of Islam preaches black supremacy, that its founder Wallace Fard Muhammad was a Messiah and his successor Elijah Muhammad was a divine messenger, and that white people were a race of devils to be overthrown apocalyptically.

Terrorist cults

In the book Jihad and Sacred Vengeance: Psychological Undercurrents of History, psychiatrist Peter A. Olsson compares Osama bin Laden to certain cult leaders including Jim Jones, David Koresh, Shoko Asahara, Marshall Applewhite, Luc Jouret and Joseph Di Mambro, and he also says that each of these individuals fit at least eight of the nine criteria for people with narcissistic personality disorders. In the book Seeking the Compassionate Life: The Moral Crisis for Psychotherapy and Society authors Goldberg and Crespo also refer to Osama bin Laden as a "destructive cult leader."

At a 2002 meeting of the American Psychological Association (APA), anti-cultist Steven Hassan said that Al-Qaeda fulfills the characteristics of a destructive cult, adding, in addition:

In an article on Al-Qaeda published in The Times, journalist Mary Ann Sieghart wrote that al-Qaeda resembles a "classic cult:"

Similar to Al-Qaeda, the Islamic State of Iraq and the Levant adheres to an even more extremist and puritanical ideology, in which the goal is to create a state governed by shari'ah as interpreted by its religious leadership, who then brainwash and command their able-bodied male subjects to go on suicide missions, with such devices as car bombs, against its enemies, including deliberately-selected civilian targets, such as churches and Shi'ite mosques, among others. Subjects view this as a legitimate action; an obligation, even. The ultimate goal of this political-military endeavour is to eventually usher in the end of the world in accordance with their Islamic beliefs and have the chance to participate in their version of the apocalyptic final battle, in which all of their enemies (i.e. anyone who is not on their side) would be annihilated. Such endeavour ultimately failed in 2017, though hardcore survivors have largely returned to insurgency terrorism (i.e., Iraqi insurgency, 2017–present).

The Shining Path guerrilla movement, active in Peru in the 1980s and 1990s, has variously been described as a "cult" and an intense "cult of personality". The Tamil Tigers have also been described as such by the French magazine L'Express.

Anti-cult movements

Christian countercult movement

In the 1940s, the long-held opposition by some established Christian denominations to non-Christian religions and supposedly heretical or counterfeit Christian sects crystallized into a more organized Christian countercult movement in the United States. For those belonging to the movement, all religious groups claiming to be Christian, but deemed outside of Christian orthodoxy, were considered cults. Christian cults are new religious movements that have a Christian background but are considered to be theologically deviant by members of other Christian churches. In his influential book The Kingdom of the Cults (1965), Christian scholar Walter Ralston Martin defines Christian cults as groups that follow the personal interpretation of an individual, rather than the understanding of the Bible accepted by Nicene Christianity, providing the examples of the Church of Jesus Christ of Latter-day Saints, Christian Science, Jehovah's Witnesses, and the Unity Church.

The Christian countercult movement asserts that Christian sects whose beliefs are partially or wholly not in accordance with the Bible are erroneous. It also states that a religious sect can be considered a cult if its beliefs involve a denial of what they view as any of the essential Christian teachings such as salvation, the Trinity, Jesus himself as a person, the ministry of Jesus, the miracles of Jesus, the crucifixion, the resurrection of Christ, the Second Coming, and the rapture.

Countercult literature usually expresses doctrinal or theological concerns and a missionary or apologetic purpose. It presents a rebuttal by emphasizing the teachings of the Bible against the beliefs of non-fundamental Christian sects. Christian countercult activist writers also emphasize the need for Christians to evangelize to followers of cults.

Secular anti-cult movement

In the early 1970s, a secular opposition movement to groups considered cults had taken shape. The organizations that formed the secular anti-cult movement (ACM) often acted on behalf of relatives of "cult" converts who did not believe their loved ones could have altered their lives so drastically by their own free will. A few psychologists and sociologists working in this field suggested that brainwashing techniques were used to maintain the loyalty of cult members. The belief that cults brainwashed their members became a unifying theme among cult critics and in the more extreme corners of the anti-cult movement techniques like the sometimes forceful "deprogramming" of cult members was practised.

Secular cult opponents belonging to the anti-cult movement usually define a cult as a group that tends to manipulate, exploit, and control its members. Specific factors in cult behaviour are said to include manipulative and authoritarian mind control over members, communal and totalistic organization, aggressive proselytizing, systematic programs of indoctrination, and perpetuation in middle-class communities. In the mass media, and among average citizens, "cult" gained an increasingly negative connotation, becoming associated with things like kidnapping, brainwashing, psychological abuse, sexual abuse and other criminal activity, and mass suicide. While most of these negative qualities usually have real documented precedents in the activities of a very small minority of new religious groups, mass culture often extends them to any religious group viewed as culturally deviant, however peaceful or law abiding it may be.

While some psychologists were receptive to these theories, sociologists were for the most part sceptical of their ability to explain conversion to NRMs. In the late 1980s, psychologists and sociologists started to abandon theories like brainwashing and mind control. While scholars may believe that various less dramatic coercive psychological mechanisms could influence group members, they came to see conversion to new religious movements principally as an act of a rational choice.

Reactions to the anti-cult movements
Because of the increasingly pejorative use of the words "cult" and "cult leader" since the cult debate of the 1970s, some academics, in addition to groups referred to as cults, argue that these are words to be avoided. Catherine Wessinger (Loyola University New Orleans) has stated that the word "cult" represents just as much prejudice and antagonism as racial slurs or derogatory words for women and homosexuals. She has argued that it is important for people to become aware of the bigotry conveyed by the word, drawing attention to the way it dehumanizes the group's members and their children. Labelling a group as subhuman, she says, becomes a justification for violence against it. She also says that labelling a group a "cult" makes people feel safe, because the "violence associated with religion is split off from conventional religions, projected onto others, and imagined to involve only aberrant groups." According to her, this fails to take into account that child abuse, sexual abuse, financial extortion and warfare have also been committed by believers of mainstream religions, but the pejorative "cult" stereotype makes it easier to avoid confronting this uncomfortable fact.

Governmental policies and actions

The application of the labels "cult" or "sect" to religious movements in government documents signifies the popular and negative use of the term "cult" in English and a functionally similar use of words translated as "sect" in several European languages. Sociologists critical to this negative politicized use of the word "cult" argue that it may adversely impact the religious freedoms of group members. At the height of the counter-cult movement and ritual abuse scare of the 1990s, some governments published lists of cults. While these documents utilize similar terminology they do not necessarily include the same groups nor is their assessment of these groups based on agreed criteria. Other governments and world bodies also report on new religious movements but do not use these terms to describe the groups. Since the 2000s, some governments have again distanced themselves from such classifications of religious movements. While the official response to new religious groups has been mixed across the globe, some governments aligned more with the critics of these groups to the extent of distinguishing between "legitimate" religion and "dangerous", "unwanted" cults in public policy.

China 

For centuries, governments in China have categorized certain religions as xiéjiào, sometimes translated as "evil cults" or "heterodox teachings". In imperial China, the classification of a religion as xiejiao did not necessarily mean that a religion's teachings were believed to be false or inauthentic, rather, the label was applied to religious groups that were not authorized by the state, or it was applied to religious groups that were believed to challenge the legitimacy of the state. In modern China, the term xiejiao continues to be used to denote teachings that the government disapproves of, and these groups face suppression and punishment by authorities. Fourteen different groups in China have been listed by the ministry of public security as xiejiao. Additionally, in 1999, Chinese Communist Party authorities denounced the Falun Gong spiritual practice as a heretical teaching, and they launched a campaign to eliminate it. However, such claims only exist in party resolutions, and has not been legitimized by Chinese own law systems. This actually made such denouncement confusing and as outlawed actions secretly conducted by Communist Party's secret policemen. According to Amnesty International, the persecution of Falun Gong includes a multifaceted propaganda campaign, a program of enforced ideological conversion and re-education, as well as a variety of extralegal coercive measures, such as arbitrary arrests, forced labour, and physical torture, sometimes resulting in death.

Russia
In 2008 the Russian Interior Ministry prepared a list of "extremist groups".  At the top of the list were Islamic groups outside of "traditional Islam", which is supervised by the Russian government. Next listed were "Pagan cults".  In 2009 the Russian Ministry of Justice created a council which it named the "Council of Experts Conducting State Religious Studies Expert Analysis."  The new council listed 80 large sects which it considered potentially dangerous to Russian society, and it also mentioned that there were thousands of smaller ones.  The large sects which were listed included: The Church of Jesus Christ of Latter-day Saints, the Jehovah's Witnesses, and other sects which were loosely referred to as "neo-Pentecostals".

United States 
In the 1970s, the scientific status of the "brainwashing theory" became a central topic in U.S. court cases where the theory was used to try to justify the use of the forceful deprogramming of cult members. Meanwhile, sociologists who were critical of these theories assisted advocates of religious freedom in defending the legitimacy of new religious movements in court. In the United States the religious activities of cults are protected under the First Amendment of the United States Constitution, which prohibits governmental establishment of religion and protects freedom of religion, freedom of speech, freedom of the press, and freedom of assembly. However, no members of religious groups or cults are granted any special immunity from criminal prosecution. In 1990, the court case of United States v. Fishman (1990) ended the usage of brainwashing theories by expert witnesses such as Margaret Singer and Richard Ofshe. In the case's ruling, the court cited the Frye standard, which states that the scientific theory which is utilized by expert witnesses must be generally accepted in their respective fields. The court deemed brainwashing to be inadmissible in expert testimonies, using supporting documents which were published by the APA Task Force on Deceptive and Indirect Methods of Persuasion and Control, literature from previous court cases in which brainwashing theories were used, and expert testimonies which were delivered by scholars such as Dick Anthony.

Western Europe 

The governments of France and Belgium have taken policy positions which accept "brainwashing" theories uncritically, while the governments of other European nations, such as those of Sweden and Italy, are cautious with regard to brainwashing and as a result, they have responded more neutrally with regard to new religions. Scholars have suggested that the outrage which followed the mass murder/suicides which were perpetuated by the Solar Temple have significantly contributed to European anti-cult positions as well as more latent xenophobic and anti-American attitudes which are widespread on the continent. In the 1980s clergymen and officials of the French government expressed concern that some orders and other groups within the Roman Catholic Church would be adversely affected by anti-cult laws which were then being considered.

See also
 Cult following
 Cult of personality
 Greco-Roman mysteries
 Secret society

References

Explanatory notes

Citations

General and cited sources

Further reading

Books

 Barker, E. (1989) New Religious Movements: A Practical Introduction, London, HMSO
 Bromley, David et al.: Cults, Religion, and Violence, 2002, 
 Enroth, Ronald. (1992) Churches that Abuse, Zondervan,  Full text online
 Esquerre, Arnaud: La manipulation mentale. Sociologie des sectes en France, Fayard, Paris, 2009.
 House, Wayne: Charts of Cults, Sects, and Religious Movements, 2000, 
 Kramer, Joel and Alstad, Diane: The Guru Papers: Masks of Authoritarian Power, 1993.
 Lalich, Janja: Bounded Choice: True Believers and Charismatic Cults, 2004, 
 Landau Tobias, Madeleine et al. : Captive Hearts, Captive Minds, 1994, 
 Lewis, James R. Odd Gods: New Religions and the Cult Controversy, Prometheus Books, 2001
 Martin, Walter et al.: The Kingdom of the Cults, 2003, 
 Melton, Gordon: Encyclopedic Handbook of Cults in America, 1992 
 Oakes, Len: Prophetic Charisma: The Psychology of Revolutionary Religious Personalities, 1997, 
 Singer, Margaret Thaler: Cults in Our Midst: The Continuing Fight Against Their Hidden Menace, 1992, 
 Tourish, Dennis: 'On the Edge: Political Cults Right and Left, 2000, 
 Zablocki, Benjamin et al.: Misunderstanding Cults: Searching for Objectivity in a Controversial Field, 2001,

Articles

 Aronoff, Jodi; Lynn, Steven Jay; Malinosky, Peter. Are cultic environments psychologically harmful?, Clinical Psychology Review, 2000, Vol. 20 No. 1 pp. 91–111
 Langone, Michael: Cults: Questions and Answers
 Lifton, Robert Jay: "Cult Formation", The Harvard Mental Health Letter, February 1991
 Robbins, T. and D. Anthony, 1982. "Deprogramming, brainwashing and the medicalization of deviant religious groups" Social Problems 29 pp. 283–297.
 Rosedale, Herbert et al.: "On Using the Term 'Cult
 Van Hoey, Sara: "Cults in Court". The Los Angeles Lawyer, February 1991
 Zimbardo, Philip: "What messages are behind today's cults?", American Psychological Association Monitor, May 1997

External links 
 
 

 
Pejorative terms